Meirionnydd Nant Conwy may refer to either of two geographically identical former constituencies in Wales:

 Meirionnydd Nant Conwy (UK Parliament constituency) (1983–2010)
 Meirionnydd Nant Conwy (National Assembly for Wales constituency) (1999–2007)